The SuperUtes Series (known for commercial reasons as the Haltech V8 SuperUte Series) is an Australian pickup truck racing competition that was launched in 2018 as a successor to the V8 Ute Racing Series. The series' events are held as a support category to Supercars Championship events throughout Australia.

Background

The V8 Ute Racing Series, which ran from 2001 to 2017, used utility vehicles based on the Ford Falcon and Holden Commodore models. However, with production of the Falcon and Commodore finishing in 2016 and 2017 respectively, utility vehicles were no longer being mass produced in Australia, which led to investigations into a new platform for the Utes series as far back as the early 2010s. While an initial plan was proposed to continue with a generic utility chassis, the Supercars Championship purchased the series in 2015 and pursued a move to a production-based series which would move away from the traditional formula.  After several delays, it was announced in 2016 that SuperUtes, based on production dual-cab diesel-powered utilities, would be introduced in 2018.

History
The inaugural season launched at the 2018 Adelaide 500 with ten cars entered, representing five manufacturers in Ford, Holden, Mazda, Mitsubishi and Toyota. Isuzu would later join the series while Dakar Rally winner Toby Price was amongst the entries in a Mitsubishi Triton. The first race for the new category was won by Ryal Harris, a three time series winner in V8 Utes, who went on to win the series in a Mazda BT-50.

The new series drew some criticism due to the small field sizes and slower lap times than V8 Utes. The higher centre of gravity also saw some SuperUtes roll over, most notably at the Queensland Raceway round in 2018 and Adelaide Street Circuit in 2019, where two vehicles rolled during each event. This led to various technical upgrades for the cars during the 2019 season, including lowered ride heights and a move to a race-specification Yokohama tyre.

The series announced further changes for the 2020 season, with the turbo diesel engine to be replaced by a LS3 V8 Engine in an attempt to reconnect with fans of the V8 Utes era. The ownership of the series also transferred from Supercars Championship to the team owners themselves. However, the 2020 season was then cancelled and the series did not re-launch in its new guise until May 2021 at The Bend SuperSprint.

Ryal Harris won his second title in the five-round 2021 SuperUtes Series, again in a Peters Motorsport Mazda BT-50. Aaron Borg won the 2022 SuperUtes Series driving for Sieders Racing Team, who had won the V8 Utes series in 2016.

Vehicle specification
2018 & 2019

4 or 5 cylinder turbo Diesel Engine evaluation
Motec ECU with Supercars engine parity program
Motec dash colour display/data logger
Exhaust – (OE manifold)
Suspension – Front and Rear SupaShock shock absorbers and springs
Brakes – Brembo 6 piston front and 4 piston rear callipers, Brembo front and rear disc’s
Tilton Pedal box and master cylinders incorporating brake bias adjustments
Xtreme Outback 230mm twin plate ceramic clutch kit
Control gearbox and ratios
Control differential and ratio
Control R-spec Yokohama tyre
20” control Hussla wheels
Control specification roll cage (bespoke to each manufacturer) – CAMS approved

2021-onwards

 Engine: Warspeed Prepared Control LS3 6.2 Ltr Engine
 Control ECU: Haltech Nexus Locked, with Control Wiring Harness
 Control Dash: Motec C125 with Data Logging
 Exhaust Manifold: Standard GM 
 Exhaust System: Twin 3inch with X Pipe
 Suspension: Pace Innovations Control Rear Adjustable Live Axle, Front standard control arms with front and rear Bilstein Control Coilovers
 Brakes: Brembo 6 piston front and 4 piston rear callipers, Brembo front and rear discs
 Foot Pedal Controls: Tilton Pedal box and master cylinders incorporating brake bias adjustments
 Gearbox: 6 Speed Tremec Control Gearbox and Ratios
 Tyres: Control R-spec Yokohama tyres
 Wheels: Control 18inch x 9.5inch Lenso Control Wheels

Series winners

References

Supercars Championship
Pickup truck racing series
Auto racing series in Australia
10 Sport